Gorse Hill is an area of Stretford, Greater Manchester, England. The population at the 2011 census was 11,894. It is a residential area with two minor industrial estates on either side of the main A56 Chester Road, which divides the two halves of the ward. Gorse Hill Park is a park which has recently had its historic main gates renovated and sits in between the two halves of the ward also, bridging Chester Road and Talbot Road. Gorse Hill is also the northernmost ward of Trafford council and is home to Trafford Town Hall, housing the council offices. Gorse Hill shares a border with the Clifford and Longford wards, and is town is home to two teams; both Manchester United F.C. and Lancashire County Cricket Club.

References

Geography of Trafford
Parks and commons in Trafford
Stretford